Bishop Udumala Bala Showreddy is the serving Bishop of the Roman Catholic Diocese of Warangal.

Early life 
He was born on 18 June 1954 in Ghanpur, Andhra Pradesh, India.

Education 
He has acquired the Doctorate in Moral Theology from Alphonsianum, Rome.

Priesthood 
He was ordained a priest on 20 February 1979. He has served in several pastoral and administrative roles in his diocese before becoming a bishop. He was deputy-secretary general of the Catholic Bishops' Conference of India (CCBI), Bangalore. From 1994 to 2006 he taught moral theology at St. John’s Regional Seminary, Hyderabad.

Episcopate 
He was appointed bishop of Warangal, India, on 13 April 2013 by Pope Francis. He was ordained a bishop on 23 May 2013 by Oswald Cardinal Gracias.

References

1954 births
Living people
21st-century Roman Catholic bishops in India
Christian clergy from Andhra Pradesh
Bishops appointed by Pope Francis
Alphonsian Academy alumni